Robin Binder (born 6 October 1994) is a German footballer who plays as a midfielder for 1. CfR Pforzheim.

References

External links
 

German footballers
Association football midfielders
SG Sonnenhof Großaspach players
3. Liga players
People from Ludwigsburg
Sportspeople from Stuttgart (region)
1994 births
Living people
Footballers from Baden-Württemberg